"You Lied to Me" is a song by British dance-pop singer-songwriter Cathy Dennis, released in August 1992 as the first single from her second album, Into the Skyline (1992). The song was written by Dennis with Greg Carmichael, Patrick Adams, and received favorable reviews from music critics. In the US, it was a top 40 hit on the Billboard Hot 100, while peaking at number 12 on the Billboard Hot Dance Club Play chart.

Critical reception
Larry Flick from Billboard wrote that Dennis "twirls back onto the dance floor with an aggressive, attitudinal pop/houser". He added, "Teaming her up with club kingpin Shep Pettibone was an inspired move. He dresses her lovely voice with vigorous beats, layers of intricate keyboard effects, and an unshakable chorus. [...] Totally fierce." Another editor stated that Dennis' vocal range "has grown considerably, as proven on "You Lied To Me", which casts her as a swaggering diva". Randy Clark from Cashbox described it as a "dance beat track" where Dennis is "keeping her dance roots alive". David Browne from Entertainment Weekly stated that it "is worthy of "Touch Me (All Night Long)" and her whooshing club hits".

Dave Sholin from the Gavin Report commented, "It's clear by her track record this multitalented singer, producer, writer has a magic touch when it comes to putting together hits for Top 40 radio. Once again, Cathy delivers a house pleaser that's sure to pump non-stop excitement onto the airwaves." A reviewer from Music & Media called it "jubilant". Sam Wood from Philadelphia Inquirer felt that "You Lied to Me" "do recall the bouncy ebullience of "Just Another Dream", Dennis' breakthrough hit." Mark Frith from Smash Hits praised the track, giving it five out of five. He stated that Dennis "gives the vocal performance of a lifetime about her two-timing man who's on his way out of her door. A triumphant return to form and runner-up best new single."

Track listings
 UK CD single
You Lied To Me (Radio Edit)
You Lied To Me (Dan's Club Mix)
You Lied To Me (Sprayed With Shep's Attitude Mix)
You Lied To Me (Pathological Mix)
You Lied To Me (Dan's Dub Mix)

 US CD single
You Lied To Me
Nothing Moves Me
You Lied To Me (Sprayed With Shep's Attitude Dub 1)
You Lied To Me (Sprayed Extended Mix)

Charts

References

1992 singles
1992 songs
Cathy Dennis songs
Polydor Records singles
Songs written by Cathy Dennis